Larga may refer to several places in Romania:

 Larga, a village in Dofteana Commune, Bacău County
 Larga, a village in Samarinești Commune, Gorj County
 Larga, a village in Suciu de Sus Commune, Maramureș County
 Larga (Lárga), a village in Sărmașu town, Mureș County
 Larga, a village in Gurghiu Commune, Mureș County
 Larga, a tributary of the Turbați (Jiu basin)
 Larga, a tributary of the Humor (Siret basin)
 Larga, a tributary of the Lotru (Olt basin)
 Larga, a tributary of the Suciu (Someș basin)
 Larga Mare, a tributary of the Timiș (Olt basin)

two places in Moldova:
 Larga, Briceni, a commune in Briceni district
 Larga, a village in Zolotievca Commune, Anenii Noi district

a species of true seal:
 Larga seal (Phoca largha)

a musical note value in mensural notation, also called the maxima.